Szabolcs Gál (born 31 March 1992) is a Hungarian professional footballer who plays for Nyíregyháza Spartacus.

Career
On 14 July 2022, Gál joined Kozármisleny. On 24 February 2023, he moved to Nyíregyháza Spartacus on a contract until the end of the 2022–23 season.

Club statistics

Updated to games played as of 18 November 2014.

References

External links

1992 births
Footballers from Budapest
Living people
Hungarian footballers
Association football defenders
Nyíregyháza Spartacus FC players
Diósgyőri VTK players
CF Liberty Oradea players
Vasas SC players
Ferencvárosi TC footballers
Lombard-Pápa TFC footballers
Budaörsi SC footballers
SZEOL SC players
Kecskeméti TE players
Kozármisleny SE footballers
Nemzeti Bajnokság I players
Nemzeti Bajnokság II players
Nemzeti Bajnokság III players
Hungarian expatriate footballers
Hungarian expatriate sportspeople in Romania
Expatriate footballers in Romania